The Tuniu Hakka Cultural Museum is a museum in Shigang District, Taichung, Taiwan.

History
The original building belongs to the Liu family. On 21 September 1999, it collapsed due to the 1999 Jiji earthquake. Afterwards, the family applied for government subsidy to reconstruct the building. Six years later it was rebuilt at the original site with its original design and appearance and named Tuniu Hakka Cultural Museum on 9 May 2006.

Architecture
The museum consists of the main reception hall and four exhibition halls. It has also many static and multimedia display.

Transportation
The museum is accessible by bus from Fengyuan Station of Taiwan Railways or Taichung Station of Taiwan High Speed Rail.

References

External links
 

2006 establishments in Taiwan
Hakka museums in Taiwan
Museums established in 2006
Museums in Taichung